Alejandro Sebastián Romero Gamarra (born 11 January 1995), nicknamed Kaku, is a professional footballer. He is currently playing as a winger for Saudi Arabian club Al-Taawoun and the Paraguay national team.

Club career

Huracán
Born in Ciudadela, Kaku began his career in the youth ranks of Huracán. In 2013, Kaku made his professional debut for Huracán in the Primera B Nacional. He scored his first goal for the club on 12 October 2013 in a 4–1 victory over Aldosivi. On 14 December 2014, Kaku helped Huracán return to the top flight after three seasons in the Primera B Nacional, scoring the decisive second goal in a 4–1 victory over Atlético Tucumán. With the promotion to the top flight, Huracán concluded a very successful season, having won the 2013–14 Copa Argentina a few weeks prior in a penalty shoot-out over Rosario Central with Kaku appearing as a second-half substitute. This was the club's first official title in 41 years.

On 3 February 2015, he scored his first goal in the Copa Libertadores against Peruvian club Alianza Lima in a 4–0 victory. On 1 March 2016, Kaku led Huracán to a historic victory in the Copa Libertadores over Peñarol at the Estadio Centenario, scoring the lone goal in the 1–0 triumph. A few weeks later, on 24 March Kaku scored his first goal in the Argentine Primera División in a 2–0 victory over Aldosivi. On 18 July 2016 he helped Huracán advance in the Copa Argentina scoring the opening goal in a 2–1 victory over Central Córdoba.

On 27 May 2017, he scored an injury time equalizer from the penalty spot in a 1–1 draw with Boca Juniors.
On 1 June 2017, Kaku scored another important goal for his club, this time an injury time goal in a 4–0 victory over Deportivo Anzoátegui in the 2017 Copa Sudamericana. The goal helped Huracán advance to the next round by a 4–3 aggregate score after having lost the first leg by three goals. On 16 June 2017, he scored the lone goal in a 1–0 victory over Unión de Santa Fe, helping his club to a crucial three points which helped Huracán avoid relegation. On 28 October 2017, Kaku scored his club's second goal in a 4–0 victory over Lanús and celebrated the goal dedicating it to his recently deceased mother.

New York Red Bulls
On 23 December 2017, it was announced by Huracán that they had agreed a deal to transfer Kaku to New York Red Bulls of Major League Soccer for a fee of $6.25 million. After resolving various issues that held up the transfer, on 16 February 2018, it was announced that he had signed with New York. Red Bulls also sent $50,000 of General Allocation Money to Atlanta United, who owned his discovery rights. On 1 March 2018, Kaku made his debut for New York in a 2–0 victory over Olimpia in the CONCACAF Champions League. On 10 March 2018, he assisted Ben Mines on the opening goal of the match on his Red Bulls league debut in a 4–0 victory over Portland Timbers. On 13 March 2018, Kaku scored his first goal for New York in a 3–1 victory over Club Tijuana in the CONCACAF Champions League, helping the club advance to semifinals of the Champions League for the first time. On 14 April 2018, Kaku scored his first league goal for New York in a 3–1 victory over the Montreal Impact.
On 28 April 2018, Kaku helped New York to a 3–2 victory over LA Galaxy, assisting on two goals and scoring the game winner with an 84th-minute penalty-kick goal. The following week, 5 May 2018, Kaku opened the scoring for New York in a 4–0 derby victory over New York City FC, he also assisted on two other goals. On 6 December 2018, Kaku was named the New York Red Bulls Newcomer of the Year for 2018 after leading the team in assists throughout the season.

Al-Taawoun
On 1 February 2021, it was announced by Al-Taawoun of the Saudi Professional League that they had agreed to a transfer for Kaku. On 17 February 2021, Romero Gamarra's former club New York Red Bulls and Major League Soccer sought arbitration against Kaku and the MLS Players Association for breach of contract. In April 2021 arbiter Shyam Das ruled against the MLSPA and Kaku and found that New York Red Bulls and Major League Soccer had exercised their unilateral contract option on Kaku prior to 31 December 2020. On 12 May 2021, Major League Soccer and New York Red Bulls filed a petition in United States federal court seeking to have the arbitration decision enforced.  On 22 July 2021, MLS and New York Red Bulls filed suit in United States federal court against Kaku's agent Scott Pearson and Pearson's company Argentine Futbol Tours LLC, alleging "tortious interference" in Kaku's move to Al-Taawoun and seeking in excess of $6 million in damages.  On 16 September 2021, MLS and New York Red Bulls voluntarily dismissed their suit against Pearson.

International career
Kaku was born in Argentina to Paraguayan parents. He was selected by Argentina's U-20 manager, Humberto Grondona to participate in the 2015 FIFA U-20 World Cup in New Zealand. On 16 May 2018, Kaku announced his desire to file a one-time switch request with FIFA to play for Paraguay. The move was approved by FIFA on 23 May 2018, and he was immediately called up to the Paraguay national team for a friendly against Japan. He made his competitive debut with Paraguay on 12 June as a substitute in the second half of the friendly match against Japan.

Career statistics

Club

International

International goals
Scores and results list Paraguay's goal tally first.

Honours
Huracán
Copa Argentina: 2013–14
Supercopa Argentina: 2014

New York Red Bulls
Supporters' Shield: 2018

References

External links

 

1995 births
Living people
Footballers from Buenos Aires
Citizens of Paraguay through descent
Paraguayan footballers
Paraguayan expatriate footballers
Paraguay international footballers
Argentine footballers
Argentine expatriate footballers
Argentina under-20 international footballers
Argentine sportspeople of Paraguayan descent
Association football midfielders
Club Atlético Huracán footballers
New York Red Bulls players
Al-Taawoun FC players
Argentine Primera División players
Primera Nacional players
Designated Players (MLS)
Major League Soccer players
Saudi Professional League players
2021 Copa América players
Expatriate soccer players in the United States
Expatriate footballers in Saudi Arabia
Argentine expatriate sportspeople in the United States
Paraguayan expatriate sportspeople in the United States
Argentine expatriate sportspeople in Saudi Arabia